Malus komarovii is an apple species of flowering plant, in the family Rosaceae.

It is native to China, Manchuria, and North Korea.

Conservation
Malus komarovii is threatened by habitat loss, and is on the IUCN Red List.

References

komarovii
Flora of China
Flora of Manchuria
Flora of North Korea
Vulnerable plants
Taxonomy articles created by Polbot
Trees of Korea